Alexander James Inch (23 October 1915 – 3 July 1994) was an Engine driver and member of the Queensland Legislative Assembly.

Early days
Inch was born at Charters Towers, Queensland, to Alexander William and his wife Elizabeth Genevieve (née Lacey) and was educated at St Columbus Primary School and Mount Carmel Christian Brothers in Charters Towers. During the depression, Inch worked in the pastoral industry and also doing railway maintenance. By the early 1940s, he had become a 1st class engine driver in Innisfail and in the 1950s he was a 1st class electrical and general winding-engine driver working for Mount Isa Mines.

Political career
At the 1960 election the seat of Burke was reincarnated and Inch, standing for the Labor Party, won the seat. He held the seat until 1972 when it was once again abolished and Inch moved to the new seat of Mount Isa but did not contest the seat in 1974.

Personal life
On the 17 Dec 1938, Inch married Rita Alice Morgans and together had one son. He died in Townsville 1994.

References

Members of the Queensland Legislative Assembly
1915 births
1994 deaths
Australian Labor Party members of the Parliament of Queensland
20th-century Australian politicians